The 1985 Ford Open Draw Cup was a Gaelic Games competition arranged by the Gaelic Athletic Association as follow-on to the high successful 1984 Centenary Cup. This was a far less popular event and there was widespread resistance. A number of counties refused to participate. The hurling competition was won by Tipperary and the football competition was won by Kerry.

Hurling

 Limerick objected to the competition and refused to enter into the hurling comp.

Football
 Dublin, Down, Kildare and Offaly refused to participate. Meath opposed the competition but decided to take part once it was to go ahead.
 League quarter-finalists were given a bye to Round 2  or later, depending on their progress in the knock-out stages of the league. Monaghan beat Armagh in National League final that year and were given a bye to the quarter-finals.

Gaelic football competitions in Ireland
Hurling competitions in Ireland
1985 in Gaelic football
1985 in hurling
1985 establishments in Ireland